Dolf Desmedt (born 27 April 1980) is a Belgian equestrian. He competed in two events at the 2004 Summer Olympics.

References

External links
 

1980 births
Living people
Belgian male equestrians
Olympic equestrians of Belgium
Equestrians at the 2004 Summer Olympics
Sportspeople from Turnhout
21st-century Belgian people